United States gubernatorial elections were held in 1923, in four states. Kentucky, Louisiana and Mississippi hold their gubernatorial elections in odd numbered years, every 4 years, preceding the United States presidential election year.

In Maryland, the usual four-year term was reduced to three years as a one-off, so that from 1926 the elections would be held in an even-numbered year rather than as previously in the odd numbered year preceding the United States presidential election year.

Results

References

Notes

 
November 1923 events